Kwanda Island is an island located near Soyo, Angola at the mouth of the Congo River.

The island's main purpose is to support oil and gas projects for the country of Angola. Several LNG projects have begun on the island.
Kwanda, Lda. is the operator of the Kwanda Base which provides logistical support to the oil and gas companies both for offshore and onshore.
Several oil and gas related companies have facilities on the island.
 Texaco
 Petromar
 Fina
 BP
 Sonangol
 Halliburton
 Bechtel

External links
 Fly over the island on YouTube

References

 

Texaco
Islands of Angola